In Greek mythology, Chesias (Ancient Greek: Χησιὰς) was the fairest of the nymphs, described as young and noble. She was the wife of the river-god Imbrasus and by him, became the mother of Ocyrrhoe, the nymph loved by Apollo.

Note

References 

 Athenaeus of Naucratis, The Deipnosophists or Banquet of the Learned. London. Henry G. Bohn, York Street, Covent Garden. 1854. Online version at the Perseus Digital Library.
 Athenaeus of Naucratis, Deipnosophistae. Kaibel. In Aedibus B.G. Teubneri. Lipsiae. 1887. Greek text available at the Perseus Digital Library.

Nymphs